Chavoshi (also Romanized as Chavoshi; also known as Chāh Voshī-ye Janūbī and Chāvoshī-ye Jonūbī) is a village in Khvormuj Rural District, in the Central District of Dashti County, Bushehr Province, Iran. At the 2006 census, its population was 581, in 138 families.

References 

Populated places in Dashti County